Maxwell Lander ("Maxie") Parks (born July 9, 1951) is an American former athlete from Fresno, California.

Winner of the USA Olympic Trials in 1976, he did not gain a medal in the individual event (he came fifth), but did become a winner of a gold medal in 4 × 400 m Men's relay race with Herman Frazier, Benny Brown, and Fred Newhouse at the 1976 Montreal Olympic Games. In the 1970s he competed for the UCLA for several years. In 1977 he ran on the 1977 IAAF Athletics World Cup, anchoring the 4 × 400 m relay team to what appeared to be a runaway victory when he collapsed on the track with a severely pulled hamstring 150m from the finish. This unfortunate injury denied the USA a seemingly certain victory in the team competition, the victory instead going to East Germany. Parks did not compete again that season, but did return in 1978 to again capture the national title at 400 m.

Any hope of Olympic success in 1980 was denied by the USA boycott of those games, but in any event Parks's form meant he only reached the semi-final stage at the Olympic trials.

Prior to UCLA he was a graduate of Washington Union High School, then Fresno City College.

In 1979 Parks coached for the Athletes in Action. 

Parks was in 2010 honoured as a member of the '100 Stars for 100 Years' for Fresno City College. In the publicity for the event, Parks is stated as having received the honour of being, in 1990, inducted into the Fresno Athletic Hall of Fame. Parks has also been elected into the California Community College Track and Field Hall of Fame

Rankings 

Parks was ranked among the best in the US and the world in the 400 m/440 y events over the period 1973 to 1978, according to the votes of the experts of Track and Field News.

USA Championships 

Parks was a very successful competitor in the US National Championships between 1973 and 1978:

Best performances 

Notes for tables:
 world rankings are based on the best time for each athlete.
 440 yard times are converted to 400 metres times by subtracting 0.3 s for manual-timed results.
 for comparison with automatically timed races, manual times have a factor of 0.14 s added.

References 

1951 births
Living people
American male sprinters
Athletes (track and field) at the 1976 Summer Olympics
Olympic gold medalists for the United States in track and field
UCLA Bruins men's track and field athletes
Track and field athletes from Arkansas
People from Arkansas City, Arkansas
Medalists at the 1976 Summer Olympics